Stand Your Ground is the second album by the band Little Barrie. The album is produced by Dan the Automator and Mike "Prince Fatty" Pelanconi. The band went for a more straight rock’n’roll sound in their own words as 

They choose to work with The Automator 

Drumming on the record are new band recruit Billy Skinner and the Blues Explosion's Russell Simins.
Hubert Sumlin joined the band in the studio, though he didn't appear in the final recording.
Some songs in Cadogan's words:

Track listing
"Bailing Out" 2:19
"Love You" 3:05
"Pin That Badge" 3:26
"Yeah We Know You" 3:47
"Green Eyed Fool" 3:34
"Pretty Pictures" 2:43
"Cash In" 5:04
"Just Wanna Play" 4:18
"Why Don't You Do It" 3:05
"Pay To Join" 4:36
"Girls and shoes" 2:04 (hidden track) Starting at time frame 5:19 of 'Pay To Join'
"If I Don't Have To Answer" (Japan bonus track)

References

External links

PBS FM interview

2006 albums
2007 albums
Little Barrie albums
Artemis Records albums